Poems, Chiefly Lyrical is a poetry collection by Alfred Tennyson, published in June 1830.

Contents 
The poems are fifty-six in number:

Of these the poems in italics appeared in the edition of 1842, and were not much altered. Those with an asterisk were, in addition to the italicised poems, afterwards included among the Juvenilia in the collected works (1871–1872), though excluded from all preceding editions of the poems. Those with both a dagger and an asterisk were restored in editions previous to the first collected editions of the works.

History 
Poems, Chiefly Lyrical, was published in 1830 by Effingham Wilson, also the publisher of Robert Browning's Paracelsus. The volume had the following title-page: Poems, Chiefly Lyrical, by Alfred Tennyson. London: Effingham Wilson, Royal Exchange, 1830. Favourable reviews appeared by Sir John Bowring in the Westminster, by Leigh Hunt in the Tatler, and by Arthur Hallam in the Englishman's Magazine.

References

Sources 

 Collins, John Churton, ed. (1900). The Early Poems of Alfred, Lord Tennyson. London: Methuen & Co. pp. vii–viii. 
 Tennyson, Hallam (1897). Alfred Lord Tennyson: A Memoir by his Son. Vol. 1. London: Macmillan & Co., Ltd. pp. 49–55. 
 "Alfred, Lord Tennyson, 1809–1892". Poetry Foundation. 19 July 2017. Accessed 9 June 2022.
 "Poems, Chiefly Lyrical". Encyclopaedia Britannica. 8 December 2016. Accessed 9 June 2022.

1830 poems
1830 books
English poetry collections
Poetry by Alfred, Lord Tennyson